Jesus piece or Jesus Piece may refer to:

Open pasture behind Jesus College, Cambridge, upon which cricket was played
"To a Young Ass: Monologue to a Young Jack Ass in Jesus Piece", 1794 poem by Samuel Taylor Coleridge 
Jesus piece (jewelry), a type of jewelry depicting the face of Jesus
Jesus Piece (album), a 2012 album by hip-hop artist the Game
Jesus Piece (band), a hardcore/metal band from Philadelphia.